In the past, after harvest time, Vietnamese people made handicraft works to meet their own needs. Their products are very skillful and sophisticated, even though they are farmers and do not specialize in handicrafts. The techniques were kept secret, but taught to relatives or fellow villagers.

The village, therefore, became a very important institution in the handicraft industry. The village's name became the trademark of handicraft products made by its villagers. Đình làng- the village's temple became the place of worship and tổ nghề the man who first taught the villagers to do these handicraft works.

When urbanization came to Vietnam, many people came to towns/cities and professionalized in the handicraft works they had done in their old village. They did not compete with one another but gathered in phường/hội, the new form of handicraft village, to help others to improve.

The Vietnamese government has recognised about 1500 handicraft villages, of which about 300 are traditional handicraft villages. These villages maintain the country's handicraft heritage.

Bamboo-weaving villages 
 Boi Khe village, Phú Xuyên District, Hà Nội Province
 Phú Vinh village, Chương Mỹ District, Hà Tây Province
 Thái Mỹ commune, Củ Chi District, Ho Chi Minh City
 Vinh Ba village, Tây Hòa District, Phú Yên Province

Bronze-casting villages 

 An Lộng village, Quỳnh Phụ District, Thái Bình Province
 Bằng Châu village, Đập Đá town, An Nhơn District, Bình Định Province
 Đại Bái village, Gia Bình District, Bắc Ninh Province
 Đông Mai village, Văn Lâm District, Hưng Yên Province
 Lò Đúc, Huế city, Thừa Thiên–Huế Province
 Ngũ Xã village, Hanoi
 Phước Kiều village, Quảng Nam Province
 Tống Xá village, Ý Yên District, Nam Định Province
 Trà Đông village, Thiệu Hóa District, Thanh Hoá Province

Carpentry villages 

 Bích Chu village, Vĩnh Phúc Province
 Bùng village, Thạch Thất District, Hà Tây Province
 Cẩm Văn, An Nhơn District, Bình Định Province
 Chợ Thủ, Chợ Mới District, An Giang
 Đông Thọ commune, Yên Phong District, Bắc Ninh Province
 Đồng Kỵ village, Từ Sơn District, Bắc Ninh Province
 Kim Bồng village, Cẩm Kim commune, Hội An town, Quảng Nam Province 
 Kha Lâm, Nam Sơn ward, Hải Phòng city
 La Xuyên village, Ý Yên District, Nam Định Province
 Mỹ Xuyên village, Phong Điền District, Thừa Thiên–Huế Province
 Ninh Phong, Hoa Lư District, Ninh Bình Province
 Thái Yên village, Đức Thọ District, Hà Tĩnh Province
 Vạn Điểm village, Thường Tín District, Hà Tây Province
 Vân Hà village, Tam Kỳ town, Quảng Nam Province

Drum-making villages 

 Đọi Tam village, Đọi Sơn commune, Duy Tiên District, Hà Nam Province
 Bình An village, Bình Lãnh commune, Tân Trụ District, Long An Province

Embroidery villages 

 Văn Lâm village, Hoa Lư District, Ninh Bình Province
 Quất Động village, Thường Tín District, Hà Tây Province
 Thanh Hà commune, Thanh Liêm District, Hà Nam Province

Flower-planting villages 

 Ngọc Hà village, Hanoi
 Nghi Tàm village, Hanoi
 Nhật Tân village, Hanoi
 Quảng Bá village, Hanoi
 Sa Đéc District, Đồng Tháp Province
 Vỵ Khê village, Nam Trực District, Nam Định Province
 Cái Mơn, Vình Thành commune, Chợ Lách District, Bến Tre Province

Forging villages 

 Đa Sỹ village, Kiến Hưng commune, Hà Đông town, Hà Tây Province
 Lý Nhân village, Vĩnh Tường District, Vĩnh Phúc Province
 Quang Trung commune, Vụ Bản District, Nam Định Province
 Vân Chàng village, Nam Giang commune, Nam Trực District, Nam Định Province

Lacquer villages 

 Boi Khe village, Chuyên Mỹ commune, Hanoi province
 Cát Đằng village, Ý Yên District, Nam Định Province
 Hạ Thái village, Thường Tín District, Hà Tây Province
 Lưu Hoàng commune, Ứng Hòa District, Hà Tây Province
 Tương Bình Hiệp, Thủ Dầu Một town, Bình Dương Province

Horn sculpture-Oyster-encrusting villages 

 Boi Khe village, Chuyên Mỹ commune, Hanoi 
 Thụy Ứng village, Thường Tín District, Hanoi
 Cao Xá, Ứng Hòa District, Hanoi
 Chuôn Ngọ village, Phú Xuyên District, Hanoi
 Ninh Xá village, Ý Yên District, Nam Định Province

Painting-making villages 

 Đông Hồ painting village, Thuận Thành District, Bắc Ninh Province
 Hàng Trống street, Hanoi
 Kim Hoàng street, Vân Canh commune, Hoài Đức district, Hanoi
 Sình village, Phú Vang District, Thừa Thiên–Huế Province

Paper-making villages 

See also Dó paper

 An Cốc village, Hồng Minh commune, Phú Xuyên District, Hanoi
 Nghĩa Đô village, Nghĩa Đô commune, Cầu Giấy District, Hanoi city
 Triều Khúc village, Tân Triều commune, Thanh Trì District, Hanoi city
 Yên Thái village, Bưởi commune, Tây Hồ District, Hanoi city
 Cót village, Yên Hòa commune, Cầu Giấy District, Hanoi city

Pottery-making villages 

 Bát Tràng porcelain village, Hanoi
 Biên Hòa city, Đồng Nai Province
 Vĩnh Long province
 Lái Thiêu town, Bình Dương Province
 Phù Lãng village, Bắc Ninh Province
 Thổ Hà village, Bắc Giang Province
 Chu Đậu village, Nam Sách District, Hải Dương Province
 Hương Canh, Bình Xuyên District, Vĩnh Phúc Province
 Thanh Hà village, Cẩm Hà commune, Hội An town, Quảng Nam Province
 Bàu Trúc (Cham language: Palay Hamuk), Ninh Phước District, Ninh Thuận Province
 Đông Triều village, Đông Triều District, Quảng Ninh Province

Rock-capturing villages 

 Ninh Vân commune, Hoa Lư District, Ninh Bình Province
 Non Nước, Ngũ Hành Sơn District, Đà Nẵng city

Weaving villages 

 Vạn Phúc silk village, Hà Đông town, Hanoi
 Tân Châu, An Giang Province
 Mỹ Nghiệp village, Ninh Phước District, Ninh Thuận Province

Vegetable-planting villages 

 Láng village, Đống Đa District, Hanoi capital.
 Trà Quế village, Cẩm Hà commune, Hội An town, Quảng Nam Province

See also 

 Hà Nội- 36 streets.

External links 

 
Handicraft villages